Isaac Goldsmith (1706- 15 June 1769) was an Anglican priest in Ireland in the 18th century.

Goldsmith was born in Elphin and educated at Trinity College, Dublin. He was Dean of Cloyne from 1736 until his death.

Notes

Alumni of Trinity College Dublin
Deans of Cloyne
18th-century Irish Anglican priests
People from County Roscommon
1706 births
1769 deaths